Sidney dos Santos may refer to:
Sidney Cristiano dos Santos (born 1981), Brazilian footballer
Sidny Feitosa dos Santos (born 1981), Brazilian footballer